John Ritter (August 27, 1910 – October 12, 1948) was an Austrian outboard midget racing driver in the 1930s.

He scored five wins in a row at the velodrome in Nutley, New Jersey and four straight at the Coney Island Velodrome.

At Castle Hill Speedway in the Bronx in 1940, Ritter won the 150-lap race from last place, an "unprecedented" performance for an outboard midget. He claimed the national flat track racing title that year, also, and the Heiserman championship in 1940 and 1941.

Ritter often won against opponents in larger and more powerful cars.

He was killed in October 1948 while changing a tire at trackside, when he was hit by another competitor.

Inductions
 Michigan Motor Sports Hall of Fame (1989)
 National Midget Auto Racing Hall of Fame (2003)

Notes

Austrian racing drivers
1948 deaths
1910 births